This is a list of awards and nominations received by Héctor Babenco, an award-winning Brazilian film director.

Awards and nominations

Academy Awards

Argentine Academy of Cinematography Arts and Sciences Awards

Bangkok International Film Festival

Cannes Film Festival

Cartagena Film Festival

Chicago International Film Festival

Cinema Brazil Grand Prize

Gramado Film Festival

Havana Film Festival

Locarno Festival

Los Angeles Film Critics Association Awards

Moscow International Film Festival

National Society of Film Critics Awards

Rome Film Festival

San Sebastián International Film Festival

São Paulo International Film Festival

Taormina Film Fest

Tokyo International Film Festival

References 

Babenco, Héctor